The following lists events that happened during 1982 in Sri Lanka.

Incumbents
 President – J. R. Jayewardene
 Prime Minister – Ranasinghe Premadasa
 Chief Justice – Neville Samarakoon

Events
 Sri Lanka has their first presidential elections with J. R. Jayewardene taking the lead with a total of 53% of all of the votes cast. The UNP party claims victory.
 The 1982 Sri Lankan national referendum took place on December 22, 1982, giving the people of Sri Lanka the option to extend the life of parliament by 6 years. It was the first and so far only national referendum to be held in Sri Lanka.

Notes 

a.  Gunaratna, Rohan. (1998). Pg.353, Sri Lanka's Ethnic Crisis and National Security, Colombo: South Asian Network on Conflict Research.

References